The 2010 Oklahoma Sooners football team represented the University of Oklahoma in the 2010 NCAA Division I FBS football season, the 116th season of Sooner football. The team was led by two-time Walter Camp Coach of the Year Award winner, Bob Stoops, in his 12th season as head coach. They played their home games at Gaylord Family Oklahoma Memorial Stadium in Norman, Oklahoma. They were a charter member of the Big 12 Conference.

Conference play began with a win in the annual Red River Rivalry over the Texas Longhorns on October 2, and concluded with a win over the Nebraska Cornhuskers in the Big 12 Championship Game on December 4. The Sooners finished the regular season with an 11–2 record (6–2 in Big 12) while winning their seventh Big 12 title and their 43rd conference title overall. They received an automatic berth to the Fiesta Bowl, where they defeated Connecticut, 48–20.

Following the season, DeMarco Murray was selected in the 3rd round of the 2011 NFL Draft, Quinton Carter in the 4th, and Jonathan Nelson and Jeremy Beal in the 7th.

Recruits

Schedule

Roster

Game summaries

Utah State

Florida State

Air Force

Cincinnati

Texas (Red River Rivalry)

Iowa State

Missouri

Colorado

Texas A&M

Texas Tech

Baylor

Oklahoma State (Bedlam Series)

    
    
    
    
    
    
    
    
    
    
    
    
    
    
    
    

The 105th Bedlam game was played in Stillwater, Oklahoma in front of 51,164 people. #9 Oklahoma State was looking to beat #13 Oklahoma and break their seven-year Bedlam losing streak. This was only the fourth time in the entire series that OSU came into the game ranked higher than OU, the last time coming in the previous season.

The game began with Oklahoma receiving the kickoff. After a punt by each team, OU had the ball back on their own 18 yard-line. The Sooners went on an 82-yard drive that was highlighted by an 18-yard rush by senior running back DeMarco Murray and a 25-yard pass from sophomore quarterback Landry Jones to junior WR Ryan Broyles, and ended with a 6-yard TD run by freshman FB Trey Millard. A few drives later, Oklahoma State was on the board with a 23-yard field goal by senior kicker Dan Bailey, and the first quarter would end with Oklahoma up 7–3. A drive that started in the first quarter ended with Jones throwing a 2-yard TD pass to Broyles. On the next drive, OSU junior QB Brandon Weeden was intercepted by senior DB Quinton Carter at the Oklahoma 45 yard-line. But just three plays later, Jones was intercepted by freshman LB Shaun Lewis, who would take it back 52 yards for a Cowboy TD. Several drives later and a TD by each team, the half would end with OU up, 24–17. The third quarter was the lowest scoring of the four, with the lone score by Oklahoma State coming on the first drive. This was an 8-play, 80-yard drive capped off with a 20-yard pass from Weeden to junior WR Josh Cooper for the TD. The fourth quarter began with the teams tied at 24. The Sooners scored three field goals to put them up by nine, and then madness ensued. After a one-minute-46-second drive, OSU would score a TD that would begin a 92-second period where two touchdowns were scored by each team. The first came by the Cowboys on their drive, and the next on an 86-yard pass from Jones to WR Cameron Kenney. Oklahoma State kick returner Justin Gilbert would return the ensuing kickoff 89 yards for a TD, and then on the very next drive, Jones would throw yet another long TD pass, this one for 76 yards to junior TE James Hanna. OSU was only able to get a field goal, and after a failed onside kick, Oklahoma ended the game with a thrilling 47–41 victory.

Oklahoma QB Landry Jones' 468 yards, 86-yard long, 37 completions and 62 attempts were all career highs, and his four touchdowns were tied for the second most of his career, but his three interceptions were the second most of his career, and his 57.1% completion was his second worst of the season. RB Roy Finch's 16 rush attempts were tied for the most of his career, and wide receiver Cameron Kenney's 6 receptions, 141 yards and two touchdowns were all career highs.

Nebraska (Big 12 Championship)

Connecticut (Fiesta Bowl)

Rankings

Statistics

Team

Scores by quarter

2011 NFL Draft 

The 2011 NFL Draft was held on April 28–30, 2011 at Radio City Music Hall in New York City. The following Oklahoma players were either selected or signed as undrafted free agents following the draft.

References

External links
 

Oklahoma
Oklahoma Sooners football seasons
Big 12 Conference football champion seasons
Fiesta Bowl champion seasons
Oklahoma Sooners football